Soundscapes is an album by pianist Cedar Walton recorded in 1980 and released on the Columbia label.

Track listing
All compositions by Cedar Walton except where noted.
 "Warm to the Touch" (Cedar Walton, S. Brickell) – 7:02
 "The Early Generation" – 7:58
 "N.P.S." – 5:10
 "Latin America" – 6:35
 "Sixth Avenue" – 7:20
 "Naturally" (Tony Dumas) – 6:41

Personnel
Cedar Walton – piano, electric piano, arranger
Freddie Hubbard – trumpet (track 2)
Steve Turre – trombone (tracks 1, 2, 4 & 5)
Emanuel Boyd – flute (tracks 2-6)
Bob Berg – tenor saxophone (tracks 1, 2, 5 & 6)
Tony Dumas – electric bass
Al Foster (tracks 1 & 4), Buddy Williams (tracks 2-5) – drums
Rubens Bassini, Ray Mantilla – percussion
Leon Thomas – vocals (track 1)

References

Cedar Walton albums
1980 albums
Columbia Records albums
Albums produced by George Butler (record producer)